This Is Your Life is a British biographical television documentary, based on the 1952 American show of the same title. It was hosted by Eamonn Andrews from 1955 until 1964, and then from 1969 until his death in 1987. Michael Aspel then took up the role of host until the show ended in 2003. It briefly returned in 2007 as a one-off special presented by Trevor McDonald.

In the show the host surprises a special guest, before taking them through their life with the assistance of the 'big red book'. Both celebrities and non-celebrities have been featured on the show. The show was originally broadcast live, and over its run it has alternated between being broadcast on the BBC and on ITV.

The surprise element was a very important part of the show; if the guest heard about the project beforehand, it would be cancelled.

History 
The British version of the show was launched in 1955 on the BBC and was first presented by Ralph Edwards to the first "victim", Eamonn Andrews, who was the presenter from the second show. The scriptwriter for the first 35 episodes was Gale Pedrick. In 1958, it was the most popular regular show on the BBC with audiences between 8.75 and 10.5 million. It ended in 1964 when Andrews moved to ABC Weekend TV, but it was revived by Thames Television for broadcast on ITV in 1969.

The only other occasion during Andrews' presentational run where he was not the presenter was in 1974 when he was the subject a second time, and the show was presented by David Nixon. Michael Aspel (himself, a "victim" in 1980) became presenter after Andrews died in 1987. The show returned to the BBC in 1994 but was still produced independently by Thames Television, by then no longer an ITV contractor. The programme was discontinued again in 2003.

At first, the show was broadcast live; later, programmes were sometimes pre-recorded. Live broadcasts ended in 1980 when boxer Alan Minter could not stop swearing during his appearance.

The show returned in June 2007 on ITV for a one-off-special programme hosted by Sir Trevor McDonald with guest Simon Cowell. The new edition was co-produced by ITV Productions, STV Productions, TIYL Productions, Click TV and Ralph Edwards Productions.

Ant & Dec's Saturday Night Takeaway featured a return of This Is Your Life to celebrate Ant & Dec's 25 years together, quizzing them on their 25 years as part of "Ant vs Dec" in episode 6 of Series 11. Michael Aspel returned as host alongside Ashley Roberts.

Notable guests 
Lynn Redgrave, in December 1996, was caught while taking her bow in her one-woman show on stage at the Haymarket Theatre, the only time the Redgrave family was seen together on stage at the same time. Bob Hope and Dudley Moore have been the only subjects of two-part editions of the programme, in 1970 and 1987 respectively. Both were broadcast over two weeks.

Clive Mantle's profile included a post-credits sequence, in which he thanked the audience for coming.

Footballer Danny Blanchflower turned down the "red book" in February 1961. Author Richard Gordon (of Doctor in the House fame) in 1974, and Bill Oddie (of The Goodies) in 2001 initially turned it down, but then relented and appeared on the show. Actor Richard Beckinsale was featured on the show at the age of 30, just sixteen months before his death.

Hattie Jacques appeared in 1963, with her husband John Le Mesurier who had helped set up the surprise; however, much to her extreme discomfort, she was at the time living separately from Le Mesurier with her lover John Schofield.

Ronnie Barker was planned to be one of the show's subjects and his wife Joy Tubb was helping the producers with the set up and pre-production, but Barker revealed in his autobiography that he had become extremely upset by his wife's obvious secrecy and even begun to suspect she might have been having an extra-marital affair. Barker confronted his wife and she had to explain to him about the programme, leading to its cancellation. Barker took the opportunity to impress upon his wife that he never wanted to be featured on the show, so future attempts to plan an edition around him were thwarted.

Maureen Lipman revealed in her first autobiographical book that she had made an arrangement with her agent and her husband that she would never participate in the programme should they ever be approached, with her husband Jack Rosenthal also agreeing he would never be the subject. Both were willing and happy to appear as a guest on other editions featuring their friends. Lipman light-heartedly revealed that her refusal to be featured was the thing that upset her mother the most about her career.

Christopher Lee was the subject of the show in April1974. He was surprised by Eamonn Andrews during a fencing match that was being filmed for the children's TV series Magpie.

Peter Davison was the featured celebrity in March 1982. He later revealed in interviews and his autobiography that the planned finale of his edition was to be the appearance of actress Beryl Reid, but Davison's then-wife Sandra Dickinson objected and persuaded the producers not to end the show in this way as Davison and Reid barely knew each other, having worked together only once for two days' recording. Reid's inclusion was to maximise publicity for the two episodes of Doctor Who that the BBC were airing at the same time as Davison's This Is Your Life. Dickinson won her argument, and although Reid appeared, the edition ended instead with the reunion of Davison and his Guyanese aunt.

In May 1971, Googie Withers was the featured guest, but the surprise planned by host Eamonn Andrews did not go according to plan, when Withers arrived in the studio, thinking she was going to be interviewed by Godfrey Winn. When Andrews stepped forward with the red book, Withers asked him why he was working as a floor manager and no longer as a presenter. This was in part due to her living in Australia where the show was not known.

In 1996, the Sunday Mirror reported that a planned show for Cockney comedy actor Arthur Mullard was pulled after researchers contacted his eldest son. The same report featured claims that Mullard had terrorised his family and had sexually abused his daughter for many years.

The programmes originally included non-celebrities who had done extraordinary things in their lives. In later years, following a persistent criticism of only celebrities being featured on the show, non-celebrities were featured again. These included business people, military personnel, the clergy and those that had performed outstanding community or charity service but who were not well known to the general public. Examples include: paramedic Allan Norman; Group Captain Leonard Cheshire; Cromer lifeboatman Henry "Shrimp" Davies; Colonel Tod Sweeney; Mary Ward, community nurse to the boat people of the canals; Chay Blyth; Sir Nicholas Winton; Group Captain Sir Douglas Bader; and Sir Fitzroy Maclean. The series never profiled serving politicians, although retired politicians were occasionally featured.

Forty-two celebrities have appeared on the show twice – including Honor Blackman, Dora Bryan, Bob Monkhouse and Eamonn Andrews himself.

David Butler was 17 when he became the youngest ever subject of This Is Your Life (episode aired 5 March 1962). He was surprised by Eamonn Andrews in the headmaster's study of Hemel Hempstead Grammar School. Butler lost both his legs and a hand when, aged 11, he found an unexploded bomb on Ivinghoe Beacon.

When snooker player Stephen Hendry was surprised with the red book in 1990, aged 21, he remarked that he had "hardly had a life".
Ant and Dec presented a one-off episode on The Chris Moyles Show in 2012 celebrating his second-to-last day on BBC Radio 1 with special guests Billie Piper, Roy Walker and Gary Barlow live from the BBC Radio Theatre.

Theme music 
The theme tune used from 1969 onwards was called "Gala Performance", and was composed by Laurie Johnson for KPM.

Transmissions

BBC

ITV

BBC1

Special

Portrayal in fiction 

In Series 8, Episode 1 of the television detective series Endeavour, Jack Swift, a celebrity footballer, is surprised by Eamonn Andrews and becomes the subject of This Is Your Life after attending a fashion show in Oxford. Andrews is played by Lewis Macleod.

References

External links 
 .
 Guest and series list (web.archive.org)

1955 British television series debuts
1950s British television series
1960s British television series
1970s British television series
1980s British television series
1990s British television series
2007 British television series endings
BBC television documentaries
British television series based on American television series
British television series revived after cancellation
English-language television shows
Television series by Fremantle (company)
Television series by ITV Studios
Television series by STV Studios
Television shows produced by Thames Television
Television shows shot at Teddington Studios